The Manchester Book Award is a project run in Manchester, UK, organised by School Services at the Manchester Library & Information Service; it is funded by the Working Neighbourhoods Fund. The project is currently in its fourth year.

Each year, a longlist of twenty-four children's books is drawn up from nominations by secondary-school pupils, school and library staff, and publishers. To be eligible for the longlist books have to be standalone books (that is, not sequels) published between 1 July and 30 June, written by authors living in the UK. Reading groups in schools and libraries then narrow this to a shortlist of six. In the following January, young people across Manchester start voting for their favourite, either online or in libraries and schools; voting for the 2009 award closed on 5 March.

The winner of the award is announced each year at a ceremony at the City of Manchester Stadium attended by pupils from the 24 state secondary schools in Manchester. The ceremony was compered in 2008 and 2009 by Paul Sleem.

The 2009 award was announced by Coronation Street actress, Julie Hesmondhalgh, on 11 March 2009.

List of Prize Winners
2009 Six Steps to a Girl by Sophie McKenzie
2008 Girl, Missing by Sophie McKenzie
2007 Beast by Ally Kennen
2006 Stuff by Jeremy Strong

Shortlists
2009
Forget Me Not by Anne Cassidy
Crash by J.A. Henderson
The Dragonfly Pool by Eva Ibbotson
Six Steps to a Girl by Sophie McKenzie
Ways to Live Forever by Sally Nicholls
The Amethyst Child by Sarah Singleton
2008
Being by Kevin Brooks
The Devil's Breath: Danger Zone by David Gilman
Do The Creepy Thing by Graham Joyce
Berserk by Ally Kennen
Nemesis by Catherine MacPhail
Girl, Missing by Sophie McKenzie
2007
Ingo by Helen Dunmore
The Drowning Pond by Catherine Forde
Hold On by Alan Gibbons
Until Proven Guilty by Nigel Hinton
Beast by Ally Kennen
The Innocent's Story by Nicky Singer
2006
Jimmy Coates: Killer by Joe Craig
The Spook's Apprentice by Joseph Delaney
Roxy's Baby by Catherine MacPhail
Wolf Brother by Michelle Paver
Stuff by Jeremy Strong
Gangsta rap by Benjamin Zephaniah

Longlists
2009
Angel Boy by Bernard Ashley
Cosmic by Frank Cottrell Boyce
Forget Me Not by Anne Cassidy
Lucky Star by Cathy Cassidy
Abela by Berlie Doherty
Bog Child by Siobhan Dowd
Sugarcoated by Catherine Forde
Dragonfly by Julia Golding
Ghosting by Keith Gray
Crash by J.A. Henderson
Slam by Nick Hornby
The Dragonfly Pool by Eva Ibbotson
Lost Riders by Elizabeth Laird
Bad Blood by Rhiannon Lassiter
Rain by Kate Le Vann
The Knife That Killed Me by Anthony McGowan
Six Steps to a Girl by Sophie McKenzie
Born to Run by Michael Morpurgo
The Knife of Never Letting Go by Patrick Ness
Ways to Live Forever by Sally Nicholls
Uncle Montague's Tales of Terror by Chris Priestley
Grave Dirt by E.E. Richardson
The Amethyst Child by Sarah Singleton
Broken Soup by Jenny Valentine
2008
Darkside by Tom Becker
Dirty Work by Julia Bell
Being by Kevin Brooks
The Spellgrinder's Apprentice by N. M. Browne
Sundae Girl by Cathy Cassidy
Sebastian Darke by Philip Caveney
Waves by Sharon Dogar
Tug of War by Catherine Forde
The Devil's Breath: Danger Zone by David Gilman
Do The Creepy Thing by Graham Joyce
Berserk by Ally Kennen
Roundabout by Rhiannon Lassiter
Red Fox Running by Robin Lloyd Jones
Kill Swap by James Lovegrove
Nemesis by Catherine MacPhail
Twin Freaks by Paul Magrs
Girl, Missing by Sophie McKenzie
Angel by Cliff McNish
Here Lies Arthur by Philip Reeve
The Rope Ladder by Nigel Richardson
Kiss of Death by Malcolm Rose
My Swordhand is Singing by Marcus Sedgwick
Finding Violet Park by Jenny Valentine
Fight Game by K. Wild
2007
Clay by David Almond
Smokescreen by Bernard Ashley
Sara's Face by Melvin Burgess
Scarlett by Cathy Cassidy
Thieves Like Us by Stephen Cole
Framed by Frank Cottrell Boyce
Cloud World by David Cunningham
Ingo by Helen Dunmore
The Drowning Pond by Catherine Forde
Hold On by Alan Gibbons
The Diamond of Drury Lane by Julia Golding
Fur by Meg Harper
Until Proven Guilty by Nigel Hinton
Raven's Gate by Anthony Horowitz
Beast by Ally Kennen
Exchange by Paul Magrs
The Riddles of Epsilon by Christine Morton-Shaw
Seeker by William Nicholson
Tamar by Mal Peet
The Foreshadowing by Marcus Sedgwick
Tins by Alex Shearer
The Innocent's Story by Nicky Singer
Heretic by Sarah Singleton
Endymion Spring by Matthew Skelton
2006
The Diary of Pelly-D by L. J. Adlington
Ten Days to Zero by Bernard Ashley
Paralysed by Sherry Ashworth
Divided City by Theresa Breslin
Bloodline by Kevin Brooks
Candy by Kevin Brooks
Indigo Blue by Cathy Cassidy
Millions by Frank Cottrell Boyce
Jimmy Coates: Killer by Joe Craig
The Spook's Apprentice by Joseph Delaney
Skarrs by Catherine Forde
The Fearful by Keith Gray
The Merrybegot by Julie Hearn
SilverFin by Charlie Higson
Jacob's Ladder by Brian Keaney
Roxy's Baby by Catherine Macphail
The Amazing Story of Adolphus Tips by Michael Morpurgo
Wolf Brother by Michelle Paver
The Hunted by Alex Shearer
Vampirates: Demons of the Ocean by Justin Somper
Stuff by Jeremy Strong
Branded by Robert Swindells
The Unrivalled Spangles by Karen Wallace
Gangsta rap by Benjamin Zephaniah

External links

Manchester Book Award Home page
Manchester Book Award at Booktrust

British children's literary awards
Awards established in 2005
2005 establishments in England
Culture in Manchester
Education in Manchester